Sir Nigel Gresley, 6th Baronet (11 January 1726 – 7 April 1787) was an English land-owner, mine-owner, and canal builder. Born into the Gresley family of Staffordshire, he enrolled at an early age in the Royal Naval Academy. He served in the Royal Navy for eight years, attaining the rank of lieutenant, before his career was cut short due to rheumatic issues. In 1753 he inherited his brother's baronetcy, and became owner of estates at Drakelow and Knypersley. As part of these he owned several mines at Apedale, and in 1775 he obtained an Act of Parliament to build Sir Nigel Gresley's Canal, which was completed in the following year and held a monopoly over Newcastle-under-Lyme coal for forty-two years. He died at Bath, Somerset, in 1787.

Life 
Nigel Gresley was born on 11 January 1726 at Drakelow Hall and was baptised on 29 January. The son of Sir Thomas Gresley, 4th Baronet, and his first wife Dorothy Bowyer, the daughter of Sir William Bowyer, his family was long established in Staffordshire and held the sixth oldest baronetcy in the country. Gresley joined the Royal Naval Academy as a scholar on 21 February 1740 and stayed there until 1744. 

Continuing his service in the Royal Navy, by the end of 1746 Gresley was serving in the 24-gun frigate HMS Bridgewater, a prison ship stationed in the Firth of Forth, as a volunteer. Bridgewater transported the Jacobite rising rebel Flora MacDonald to London, leaving on 7 November and arriving in the River Thames on 29 November. Gresley, who was suggested to be a quiet supporter of the Jacobites, was gifted a Richard Wilson portrait of her in thanks for the kindness shown to her in captivity. He was then promoted to lieutenant on 22 April 1748 and was appointed to serve on the 22-gun frigate HMS Inverness, which he did until she was paid off on 14 November of the same year, having served only in home waters. He did not serve again in the Royal Navy, probably due to rheumatic issues, and declined a posting to the 24-gun frigate HMS Mercury in March of 1749 or 1750.

Gresley succeeded his elder brother Sir Thomas Gresley, 5th Baronet as baronet on 23 December 1753 after the latter died of smallpox without issue. As well as Drakelow in Derbyshire, Gresley inherited from his mother's family their home of Knypersley Hall at Biddulph, Staffordshire. Drakelow was inhabited by Dame Wilmot Gresley, and so Gresley lived at Knypersley. He became High Sheriff of Staffordshire in 1759, serving out his year-long term of office. In 1765 he and his family moved from Knypersley to Worcester both to allow his children better access to education and to help Gresley lessen the weight of some debts, accrued from business ventures. He subsequently sold Knypersley in 1767 in a further effort to combat his debts.

Gresley owned mines at Apedale in Staffordshire, and as an early patron of the engineer James Brindley he had him build a water engine for draining the mines there in 1752. In 1775 an Act of Parliament was passed allowing Gresley and his son to build a private canal from Apedale to Newcastle-under-Lyme so that he could more easily transport the mine's products of coal and ironstone. The canal opened in 1776 and was named Sir Nigel Gresley's Canal; the act provided Gresley with a monopoly over coal in Newcastle, with all coal apart from that used for pottery coming from his mines and canal for a period of forty-two years. Mostly built on land already owned by Gresley, the project was profit-driven but also resulted in the price of coal being set at the same rate until the expiration of the act, greatly to the benefit of the local public.

Having moved at some point to Bath for health-related reasons, Gresley died there on 17 April 1787, possibly of dropsy, and was buried in Bath Abbey on 21 April. He was eulogised by Philip Thicknesse, who wrote that Gresley was "a kind husband, a tender father, a zealous friend, an hospitable neighbour. He was brave without boasting, and was just such a man as Sterne describes his uncle Toby, to whose kindness the weak would fly for protection". Gresley is also remembered by a plaque within Bath Abbey, and the Gresley Arms, a public house in Alsagers Bank, is named for him.

Family 

Gresley married his cousin Elizabeth Wynn, the daughter of the Reverend Ellis Wynn of Congleton, on 18 May 1752. Together they had a son and seven daughters:

 Sir Nigel Bowyer Gresley, 7th Baronet (18 March 1753 – 26 March 1808)
 Dorothy Gresley (12 May 1754 – 1755)
 Anne Heathcote (11 May 1755–September 1797), married industrialist Sir John Edensor Heathcote
 Elizabeth Gresley (18 August 1756 – 10 April 1839)
 Frances Gresley (30 November 1757 – 30 September 1836)
 Louisa Jane Gresley (5 October 1759 – 20 April 1806), married the Reverend William Gresley
 Harriet Jelly (9 February 1761 – 25 May 1832), married the solicitor John Jelly
 Mary Susanna Proby (23 April 1762 – 1 November 1820), married the Reverend Baptist John Proby

References

Sources 

 
 
 
 
 
 
 
 
 
 

1727 births
1787 deaths
People from South Derbyshire District
English canal engineers
Baronets in the Baronetage of England
High Sheriffs of Staffordshire
English landowners
18th-century British engineers
18th-century English people
People from Biddulph